Gadzhimurad Nurmagomedov (born 1 May 1987) is an Armenian Freestyle wrestler of Dagestani descent. He competed at the 2012 Summer Olympics in the men's freestyle 84 kg division. Nurmagomedov first defeated former Olympic silver medalist Yusup Abdusalomov in the first preliminary match, with a technical score of 4–4, and a classification score of 1–3.  For the second preliminary match, Nurmagomedov, however, was defeated by Ehsan Lashgari, who scored a total of five points in two successive periods, while also being disqualified in the process.

References

External links
 

1987 births
Living people
Sportspeople from Makhachkala
Armenian people of Dagestani descent
Armenian male sport wrestlers
Olympic wrestlers of Armenia
Wrestlers at the 2012 Summer Olympics
21st-century Armenian people